Dehler Park is a multi-use stadium in Billings, Montana. It is primarily used for baseball and is the home of the Billings Mustangs of the independent  Pioneer League. It is also the home field of the Montana State University Billings Yellowjackets. The ballpark opened on June 29, 2008 and has a capacity of 3,071 people (6,000 including standing room only).  It replaced Cobb Field which was a fixture in Billings since the 1930s.  The groundbreaking ceremony took place March 22, 2007.

The stadium was named by Billings businessman Jon Dehler, who purchased the naming rights in 2007 to honor his father, Billy Joe Dehler. The park still has part of Cobb Field included, as a section down the right field line includes some of the same bench seating used at the old stadium. Outside of that and the over 2,500+ individual seats are two grass berm areas for picnic seating. Patrons can walk around the entire field thanks to an outfield terrace, which is also home to those who buy a standing room-only ticket. Theoretically the stadium could feasibly hold well over 6,000 people with a large standing room-only crowd.

The first event at the stadium was on June 29, 2008, an American Legion baseball game between the Billings Scarlets and Bozeman Bucks. The Bucks led 10–3 when the game was suspended after seven innings due to malfunctions with the lights. It was completed at Pirtz Field, the local Legion Ballpark, the following night with the Bucks winning 16–3. The first home run, hit by Matt Comer of the Bucks, was retrieved by a man riding a bicycle outside the stadium. After some speculation as to what would become of the ball, the owner of the ball came forth and agreed to donate the ball to the Billings Parks and Recreation Department for a Dehler Park Hall of Fame display.

On June 30 the park hosted local Little League championship games before the Billings Mustangs and Great Falls Voyagers met in the first professional baseball game at the park on July 1. The Mustangs won a rain-soaked 9–7 game highlighted by a Michael Konstanty grand slam which stands as the first professional homer at the field. Attendance for the game was 3,749.

In 2021 the park was featured in a Geico commercial.

Notable performers
Other uses for the stadium include concerts and plays. Some of the most notable performers at Dehler Park include:
Bob Dylan and John Mellencamp – August 11, 2010

References

External links

Billings Mustangs – Dehler Park
Montana State University Billings Yellowjackets Athletics – Dehler Park
Billings Parks & Recreation – Dehler Park

Baseball venues in Montana
College baseball venues in the United States
Sports venues in Billings, Montana
Montana State Billings Yellowjackets baseball
2008 establishments in Montana
Sports venues completed in 2008